The Gatlinburg Open was a golf tournament on the LPGA Tour from 1957 to 1958. It was played at the Gatlinburg Country Club in Gatlinburg, Tennessee.

Winners
Gatlinburg Open
1958 Louise Suggs

Smokey Open
1957 Beverly Hanson

References

Former LPGA Tour events
Golf in Tennessee
Recurring sporting events established in 1957
Recurring sporting events disestablished in 1958
1957 establishments in Tennessee
1958 disestablishments in the United States
Gatlinburg, Tennessee
History of women in Tennessee